Rapunzel's Tangled Adventure (formerly known as Tangled: The Series for its first season) is an American animated television series developed by Chris Sonnenburg and Shane Prigmore and produced by Disney Television Animation that premiered on Disney Channel as a Disney Channel Original Movie titled Tangled: Before Ever After on March 10, 2017, with regular episodes premiering on March 24, 2017. The series is based on the 2010 film Tangled and features the returning voices of Mandy Moore and Zachary Levi, alongside Eden Espinosa, Clancy Brown, Julie Bowen, James Monroe Iglehart, Jeff Ross, Paul F. Tompkins and Jeremy Jordan.
 
In May 2018, ahead of the premiere of the series' second season, it was announced that the series has been renewed for a third and final season, which premiered on October 7, 2019.

Series overview

Episodes

Film (2017)

Season 1 (2017–18)

Season 2 (2018–19)

Season 3 (2019–20)

Shorts

Tangled: Short Cuts
A series of shorts were released that focused on Rapunzel and her friends' activities in Corona. While the second half of the shorts aired during season 2, they chronologically take place during the first season as the setting is still in Corona.

Disney Theme Song Takeover
As part of a promotional campaign, Disney Channel began airing the Disney Theme Song Takeover wherein supporting characters from different shows performed the theme song to the series they were in.

Chibi Tiny Tales (2021)
Disney began releasing new shorts titled Chibi Tiny Tales as a loose follow up to Big Chibi 6 The Shorts. The shorts started airing almost a year after the series ended.

References

Lists of American children's animated television series episodes
Lists of Disney Channel television series episodes
Tangled (franchise)